Ashley Jovon Lelie (born February 16, 1980) is a former American football wide receiver. He was drafted by the Denver Broncos 19th overall in the 2002 NFL Draft. He played college football at Hawaii.

Lelie has also played for the Atlanta Falcons, San Francisco 49ers, Oakland Raiders and was briefly signed by the Kansas City Chiefs, but was released before the 2009 season began.

Early years
Lelie attended Radford High School in Honolulu, Hawaii, and was a three-sport standout in football, track, and basketball. In football, he won All-District and All-State honors. In basketball, he won All-District honors and in track, he won an All-League honors.

In 2006, Lelie donated a scoreboard to his alma mater. Ashley is the son of retired United States Marine Rene Allday Lelie and  Annetta Lelie a nurse.

College career
Lelie was a standout wide receiver at Hawaii from 1999 to 2001. He places prominently on Hawaii's career receiving lists:
 8th in career receptions (194)
 5th in career receiving yards (3,341)
 4th in career receiving touchdowns (32)

NFL career
Lelie was selected by the Denver Broncos with their first pick (19th overall) in the 2002 NFL Draft.  He became a starter in 2004 when he recorded his best year with 54 receptions for 1,084 yards.

Lelie became unhappy in Denver at the start of the 2006 season when Denver traded for Javon Walker during the 2006 NFL Draft.  He skipped training camp and asked to be traded, which led to tension with head coach Mike Shanahan.

Lelie was traded to the Atlanta Falcons in a three-way deal with the Washington Redskins in August 2006, and went on to play as a backup for the San Francisco 49ers and the Oakland Raiders in subsequent seasons.

Coaching career
In 2014 Lelie was hired by the Alabama A&M Bulldogs football team to be their wide receivers coach.

During the 2013 football season Lelie served as the offensive quality control coach for the Nevada Wolf Pack football team under new head coach Brian Polian. Lelie joined former Hawaii teammate and offensive coordinator Nick Rolovich.

See also
 List of NCAA major college football yearly receiving leaders

References

External links
Official Website
Kansas City Chiefs bio
Oakland Raiders bio

1980 births
Living people
Players of American football from Honolulu
Players of American football from California
American football wide receivers
Hawaii Rainbow Warriors football players
Denver Broncos players
Atlanta Falcons players
San Francisco 49ers players
Oakland Raiders players
Kansas City Chiefs players
Admiral Arthur W. Radford High School alumni